Fort McPherson was a former U.S. Army military base located in Atlanta, Georgia, bordering the northern edge of the city of East Point, Georgia. It was the headquarters for the U.S. Army Installation Management Command, Southeast Region; the U.S. Army Forces Command; the U.S. Army Reserve Command; the U.S. Army Central.

History 
Named after Major General James Birdseye McPherson, the fort was founded by the U.S. Army in September 1867 on the grounds where Spelman College is now located. During the Reconstruction Era, between 1867 and 1881, it was named the "McPherson Barracks", and served as a post for U.S. troops in Atlanta, garrisoning elements of the 2nd, 16th and 18th U.S. Infantry Regiments and the 5th Artillery during their mission to enforce U.S. regulations after the American Civil War. 

With the end of Reconstruction, the barracks were closed and sold off in 1881, though the site continued to be used during summers by U.S. troops stationed in Florida. In 1885, the land was again purchased by the Army at which to station ten Army companies.

During World War I, Fort McPherson was used as a camp for Imperial German Navy prisoners of war and as a training site for the Active Army and Georgia National Guard. A rifle range was operated along the ridge where current Stanton road now exists. The deploying officers and NCOs surveyed the local Civil War entrenchments parallel to the railroad along Utoy Creek to learn about trench warfare.

During the General Textile Workers Strike in 1934, the fort was used as a detention center to hold picketers who had been arrested while striking at a cotton mill in Newnan, Georgia.

Fort McPherson's nearest Army neighbor, and its sub-post, was Fort Gillem, previously established as the Atlanta Army Depot in 1941, is located in Forest Park, Georgia, approximately 11 miles to the southeast. Fort Gillem was a logistical support base, housing some Army, Department of Defense, and other government agencies. Those units include the First Army, the U.S. Army and Air Force Exchange Distribution Center, the Military Entrance Processing Station, and the U.S. Army Second Recruiting Brigade. Fort Gillem was also the host to the only crime lab of the U.S. Army. Fort McPherson and Fort Gillem shared most common services. Since the closure of Fort McPherson, Fort Gillem has been reduced to the Gillem Enclave partnership with Fort Gordon, both due to the 2005 BRAC commission.

In 2007, 2,453 active duty soldiers and 3,784 civilian employees were at both forts, with a total active duty and civilian employee payroll of $529,874,972.

With only 102 family quarters and 272 single soldier billets at Fort McPherson, and 10 family quarters at Fort Gillem, the active duty military and Department of the Army civilian employees lived in civilian housing in the surrounding Fulton, DeKalb, Clayton, Fayette, and Henry Counties.

Other important users of the fort facilities were the 98,700 or more Atlanta area military and naval retirees and their family members. These residents live mostly in Fulton, DeKalb, Cobb, Clayton, Fayette, Gwinnett, and Henry counties.

Transportation 

For urban mass transit, Fort McPherson was mostly served by the Lakewood/Fort McPherson MARTA (Metropolitan Atlanta Rapid Transit Authority) station.

After closure 

On June 26, 2015, Fort Mac LRA became the owner of 145 acres of property on the former Fort McPherson in Southwest Atlanta, Georgia. Fort Mac LRA is responsible for ensuring quality reuse and redevelopment of 145 acres on the former Army post. The Fort Mac LRA board of directors are nominated by the Mayor of Atlanta, the Fulton County Commission or the Governor. In June 2015, 330 acres of Fort McPherson was purchased by actor/producer Tyler Perry to be the new home of Tyler Perry Studios. Tyler Perry Studios grand opening occurred on October 5, 2019.

2005 Base realignment and closure (BRAC) 

As a result of the BRAC 2005 recommendation, Fort McPherson was closed down September 15, 2011, and Fort Gillem reduced to a military enclave.

Units relocated 
The following units were relocated from Fort McPherson: the Headquarters of the U.S. Army Forces Command and the Headquarters of the U.S. Army Reserve Command, were moved to Fort Bragg, North Carolina. The Headquarters, U.S. Army Central, was moved to Shaw Air Force Base Sumter South Carolina. The Installation Management Command, Southeast Region and the U.S. Army Network Enterprise Technology Command, Southeastern Region was moved to Fort Eustis, Virginia. The Army Contracting Agency, Southern Region Office, was moved to Fort Sam Houston, Texas.

The following Fort Gillem units were relocated: Headquarters, First Army, to Rock Island Arsenal, Ill.; 2nd Recruiting Brigade to Redstone Arsenal, Ala.; the 52nd Ordnance Group (EOD) to Fort Campbell, Ky.; the 81st Regional Readiness Command Equipment Concentration Site to Fort Benning, Ga.; and the U.S. Army Central Headquarters support office to Shaw Air Force Base, S.C. The Army and Air Force Exchange Service Atlanta Distribution Center will cease operations and the Federal Emergency Management Agency will move off the installation.

Fort Gillem became a contiguous enclave for the Georgia Army National Guard, the remainder of the 81st RRC units, the Criminal Investigation Division Forensics Laboratory and the Navy's Reserve Intelligence Area 14, which relocated from Naval Air Station Atlanta. Units have requested discretionary moves into the enclave, included the Atlanta Fraud Residence Agency, the Southeastern Fraud Field Office, the South East Regional Storage Management Office and the Civil Support Readiness Group-East.

Forest Park/Fort Gillem Redevelopment 
The Forest Park/Fort Gillem Local Redevelopment Authority (LRA) primary development objectives were to stimulate economic growth, create a high-value redevelopment plan; improve education, quality of life, and the perception of the area and ensure one community. The redevelopment plan adopted was primarily light industrial and logistical, with a smattering of commercial, residential, and retail space.

McPherson Redevelopment 
The McPherson Planning Local Redevelopment Authority (MPLRA) is the entity authorized by the Department of Defense to develop a plan for what will become of Fort McPherson. It is a multijurisdictional body representing surrounding communities impacted by the base closure. It bought the land for about $30 million. The MPLRA executive board approved a reuse plan in September 2007 with a science and technology park and a mix of shops, residences and office space:

The research park would be anchored by state investment and contain Georgia University system components. The research park will be developed by a task force that includes the University System Board of Regents, local governmental entities and private partners.
This high-density area is seen as a "Main Street" development with a mid-rise residential area, a hotel, public plazas and street-level retail, restaurants, offices, and grocery stores.
Most of the buildings in this area are already on the National Register of Historic Places. This district centers on the existing parade ground and is expected to be developed for mixed use, but with a historical cultural theme. Within the historic district, Staff Row would be preserved and used for single-family residential or other complementary uses.
 Other areas will be home for up to 4,600 units of residential housing, a balanced mix of market rate, high-end housing, affordable housing, and housing for the formerly homeless or families at risk of homelessness.
 Approximately  would be set aside for green space. This would connect to the historic area to create a public-oriented Linear Park centerpiece that wraps around the entire property from the Metropolitan Atlanta Rapid Transit Authority (MARTA) station on the north to the MARTA station on the south.
 The Department of Defense transferred 10 acres of land and six buildings of Fort McPherson to the United States Department of Veterans Affairs. The Atlanta VA Fort McPherson campus provides services to the Atlanta veterans community such as the Fort McPherson VA Clinic, VA Domiciliary Residential Rehab Treatment Program, Healthcare for Homeless Veterans HCHV, Community Resource and Referral Center CRRC.

In August 2014, a plan to sell a large portion of McPherson to filmmaker Tyler Perry became public. State Senator Vincent Fort and residents called for more transparency.

Units

Installation Management Command, Southeast Region 
The Installation Management Command, Southeast Region (IMCOM-SE), is located in Building 171 at Fort McPherson and has the
function of managing Army installations in the southeastern United States and Puerto Rico. IMCOM-SE provides all base operations, public works and family support programs, ensuring the readiness of Soldiers, Families and military units. It has more than 15,000 employees across the southeast and manages a $2.2 billion annual operating budget.

The region is responsible for, delivering to standard, all facets of installation support, including care of Soldiers and Families; morale, welfare and recreation; education services, food and laundry; religious support; force protection; fire and emergency services; public works; environmental; residential housing; and execution of DoD base realignment.

The IMCOM-SE team includes Anniston Army Depot, Ala.; Blue Grass Army Depot, Ky.; Fort Benning, Ga.; Fort Bragg, N.C.; Fort Buchanan, Puerto Rico; Fort Campbell, Ky.; Fort Gordon, Ga.; Fort Jackson, S.C.; Fort Knox, Ky.; Fort McPherson, Ga.; Fort Rucker, Ala.; Fort Stewart, Ga.; Holston Army Ammunition Plant, Tenn.; Milan Army Ammunition Plant, Tenn.; Mississippi Army Ammunition Plant, Miss.; Military Ocean Terminal Sunny Point, N.C.; Redstone Arsenal, Ala.; and the U.S. Army Garrison, Miami, Fla.

The region supports the senior mission commander on each installation by relieving him or her of the requirement to oversee day-to-day garrison operations. The region exercises installation management, provides for public safety, provides for sound stewardship of resources, executes community and Family support services and programs and maintains and improves installation infrastructure.

IMCOM-SE is one of six regions under the Installation Management Command, which is headquartered at Arlington, Va. IMCOM was first organized as the Installation Management Agency in 2002. In 2006, IMCOM was activated as a three-star command that includes the former Installation Management Agency, the former Community and Family Support Center and the former Army Environmental Center under a single command as a direct reporting unit.

U.S. Army Forces Command 
U.S. Army Forces Command (FORSCOM) is the largest command in the U.S. Army and the Army's Force Provider to combatant commanders worldwide. FORSCOM combines the contributions of more than 750,000 Army National Guard, Army Reserve and active component Soldiers with those of more than 2,400 Army civilians to form a seamless, winning force that operates as a team across services, components and units. FORSCOM provides relevant and ready land power worldwide, in defense of the nation, at home and abroad.

Headquartered at Fort McPherson, FORSCOM trains, mobilizes, deploys, sustains, transforms and reconstitutes combat-ready Army forces capable of responding rapidly to crises worldwide. Using the Army Force Generation (ARFORGEN) process, FORSCOM tailors the resources and training of its units to meet the specific and ever-changing requirements of combatant commanders and, when directed, those of U.S. civil authorities. These requirements can range from fighting the war on terrorism to providing relief to natural disaster victims.

FORSCOM reports through two chains of command; as an army command responsible directly to the chief of staff of the Army for the readiness, manning, equipping, training, mobilization and deployment of assigned forces, and as an Army Service Component Command, reporting to Joint Forces Command in Norfolk, Va. In this role, FORSCOM provides Army forces to the joint war fight. FORSCOM units also participate in multinational exercises to build confidence among U.S. allies and friends.

The active component of FORSCOM has nearly 200,000 Soldiers stationed nationwide. This number includes three Army corps—I Corps at Fort Lewis, Wash.; III Corps at Fort Hood, Texas; and XVIII Airborne Corps at Fort Bragg, N.C. FORSCOM also has eight divisions, multiple brigade combat teams and a full range of other combat, combat support and combat service support units.

First Army at Fort Gillem reports to FORSCOM. It is responsible for the training, readiness, mobilization and deployment support for Army National Guard and Army Reserve units in FORSCOM. It also executes FORSCOM missions within the continental United States and Puerto Rico. Army Reserve units are part of the federal force and make their primary contribution to FORSCOM's combat power by providing support specialties such as medical, civil affairs, public affairs, transportation, maintenance and supply. As such, the Reserve accounts for about 45 percent of the Army's total combat service support strength and about 30 percent of the total combat support units. Many Reserve units are designated to deploy early for contingency operations worldwide.

The Army National Guard provides FORSCOM a balanced force of eight National Guard combat divisions, 32 separate brigades and extensive supporting units. The current FORSCOM Army National Guard strength is about 350,000 Soldiers. Mobilizing the Army National Guard into active federal service would bring the total strength of FORSCOM to nearly two-thirds of the Army's combat ground forces.

U.S. Army Reserve Command 
The U.S. Army Reserve Command (USARC) has approximately 191,000 U.S. Army Reserve Soldiers and 10,000 DA civilian employees. It commands all U.S. Army Reserve conventional forces in the continental U.S. and Puerto Rico. Units in the Army Reserve have a warfight focus on combat support and combat service support missions for the Total Army and include medical, legal, civil affairs, chemical warfare, transportation, engineering and military police.

The USARC was established in October 1990 as a major subordinate command of the U.S. Army Forces Command (FORSCOM). In September 1998, the USARC moved from leased facilities into their headquarters building on Fort McPherson. In 2007, the USARC transferred from reporting to FORSCOM to reporting directly to DA. Approximately 900 civilians, contractors and Soldiers work at the headquarters.

The USARC provides command, control and support for all Army Reserve troop units in the continental United States. The USARC also ensures the readiness of its force and prepares more than 2,000 Troop Program Units under its command to mobilize in support of joint war-fighting contingencies and operations other than war. Since Sept. 11, 2001, the Army Reserve has mobilized approximately 185,000 Soldiers in support of the Global War on Terrorism. Missions throughout the world where Army Reserve Soldiers are currently providing support include Afghanistan, Iraq, Kuwait, the Balkans and Africa.

The Chief, Army Reserve, Washington, D.C., also serves as the commanding general of the U.S. Army Reserve Command. Since 2003, the Army Reserve has taken an aggressive approach to transitioning the force from a strategic environment to an operational force. With BRAC initiatives and transformation, proposed changes will make the Army Reserve more deployable and functional in order to serve America's military needs in the 21st century. Units will be functionally aligned forces that will not only benefit the Army Reserve, but the total military in terms of readiness and responsiveness to operational requirements.

Within the United States, Army Reserve Soldiers are actively involved in the homeland defense antiterrorism effort while continuing to provide support to military and federal agencies following natural and man-made disasters. USARC's focus is on training, readiness, mobilization support and providing federal military assistance to other federal agencies.

U.S. Army Central 
U.S. Army Central (USARCENT) is committed to supporting the objectives of US Central Command (CENTCOM) in some of the most volatile regions of the globe-the Middle East and South and Central Asia. In 1998, CENTCOM assumed responsibility for Kazakhstan, Kyrgyzstan, Tajikistan, Turkmenistan and Uzbekistan, in turn broadening USARCENT's mission in this very important region of the world.

Assigned as the Army component to CENTCOM, USARCENT is the only Army-level headquarters in the force structure today manned and ready to provide the CENTCOM with a fully deployable, warfighting command and control headquarters anywhere in the world. USARCENT is capable of commanding ground combat forces operating as a joint task force, a coalition joint task force or as an army echelon-above-corps headquarters.

During wartime, USARCENT becomes the Coalition Forces Land Component Command (CFLCC), responsible for commanding all forces involved in ground operations in its area of responsibility.

Since USARCENT beginning as the Third Army in 1918, it has played major roles in America's military history, serving in World Wars I and II, the Persian Gulf War and now the war on terrorism in Afghanistan, Iraq and other parts of the region. Over and over, USARCENT has demonstrated its determination, capabilities and flexibility to deter aggression in different parts of the world.

USARCENT does not have a fixed force structure of assigned units. Instead, it has a central reservoir composed of both active and reserve units based throughout the United States from which it may draw forces tailored to specific situations. In short, USARCENT continually customizes packages geared to sustain operation in the region 365 days a year in support of our national security objectives and obligations, filling a vital defense need and complementing USARCENT's rich heritage and proud traditions.

Under the leadership of Gen. George S. Patton Jr., the 3rd Army participated in eight major operations in World War II, fighting through France, Belgium, Luxembourg, Germany, Czechoslovakia and Austria. After performing Army-of-occupation duty following Germany's surrender, Third Army returned to Atlanta in March 1947. Later that year, it moved to Fort McPherson, where it remained until it inactivated Oct. 1, 1973. In December 1982, Third Army was reactivated in Atlanta and assumed its current mission.

Third Army deployed to Saudi Arabia in August 1990 to assume its role as the senior Army headquarters under CENTCOM. At the peak of the build-up, the Third Army command oversaw more than 338,000 coalition forces, including 303,000 U.S. Army soldiers plus British and French ground forces. It was responsible for deploying, receiving and sustaining all Army forces deployed to the Persian Gulf in 1990 and 1991. The headquarters developed the initial defensive plan for Saudi Arabia, and later the offensive ground plan. Following the war, Third Army supervised the relief effort to restore life support facilities in Kuwait and provided protection for Iraqi refugees in southern Iraq.

USARCENT plans and executes an intensive schedule of joint and combined exercises in countries throughout the region, including the "Intrinsic Action" series in Kuwait and the "Bright Star" series in Egypt. Also, the headquarters manages the pre-positioned equipment program in this region to sustain a rapid response to future crisis.

Immediately following the terrorist attacks on the World Trade Center and the Pentagon in September 2001, USARCENT began preparing for future operations - the United States invasion of Afghanistan. The command was also heavily involved in the 2003 invasion of Iraq and the following Iraq War.

Army Ground Forces Band 
The 214th Army Band (The Army Ground Forces Band) was organized in 1845 in Texas as the 4th Infantry Regiment Band. Its heritage, which includes 26 campaign streamers and two awards of the French Croix de Guerre, spans the Mexican War, the American Civil War, the Spanish–American War, the Philippine–American War and both World Wars.

During the Battle of Monterrey, Mexico, the band captured and turned an artillery battery against the enemy. To commemorate this distinguished service, President Zachary Taylor authorized the band to wear red piping on the uniform, making it the only Army band to receive a combat distinction from a president of the United States.

The band fought with the victorious Third Division, which spearheaded the Battle of the Marne in July 1918. Having served in Alaska during World War II, the band participated in the Aleutian Islands operation in May 1943. Following World War II, the 4th Infantry Regiment Band was re-designated the 214th Army Band. Since 1945, this organization has been stationed in Fort Lewis, Washington; Fort Hood, Texas; Fort Meade, Maryland; Fort Richardson, Arkansas; Fort McPherson, Georgia; and Fort Bragg, North Carolina. The unit was reassigned as the band for Headquarters, U.S. Army Forces Command, Fort McPherson, in 1973. Secretary of the Army John O. Marsh Jr. conferred the special designation "The Army Ground Forces Band" in 1985. It was inactivated in 2016.

U.S. Army Forces Command is charged with the combat readiness of active and reserve component Army units and the Army Ground Forces Band has been designated as the "Musical Ambassador of the American Combat Soldier." The mission of the Army Ground Forces Band is to fulfill the requirements of U.S. Army Forces Command at local, national, and international events by providing musical support for military, state, recruiting and civil functions, formal concerts, and recreational activities. The Army Ground Forces Band consists of a variety of musical ensembles, including the marching band, the concert band, the Jazz Guardians, the Old Flint River Dixieland Band, the rock band "The Loose Cannons," and various ceremonial and chamber ensembles.

First Army 
First Army is the senior military activity at Fort Gillem. First Army is one of two Continental U.S. Armies in U.S. Army Forces Command. Headquarters, First Army, is staffed by a specialized team of active Army, active Guard and Reserve Soldiers and DA civilian employees. It has an integrated command structure that includes more than 10,000 Active and Reserve Component (RC) Soldiers.

First Army's area of operations includes 27 states east of the Mississippi River (including Minnesota), two territories (Puerto Rico and the U.S. Virgin Islands) and the District of Columbia. Its customer base involves support to more than 350,000 RC Soldiers.

First Army's mission centers around the three core functions of training and readiness: support, mobilization of RC forces and homeland defense.

First Army enhances the combat readiness of RC Soldiers and units by providing training and readiness support. It facilitates the RC units' ability to execute missions throughout the full spectrum of military operations. This is done by providing observer/controller trainers and maintaining direct contact with RC units.

First Army plans, prepares and executes the mobilization and deployment of RC units to provide combat-ready forces to war fighting combatant commanders. It supports presidential reserve call-ups (such as Bosnia, Kosovo and Kuwait) as well as full and partial mobilizations (such as support of homeland defense (HLD)). In fulfilling this responsibility, First Army has mobilized more than 110,000 Army National Guard and Army Reserve troops for Operations Enduring Freedom, Noble Eagle and Iraqi Freedom since the September 11 attacks in 2001.

First Army conducts HLD in support of national objectives, as directed. This means First Army is the regional DoD planning agent for military support to civil authorities during a response to natural or manmade disasters. This mission directly supports the Federal Response Plan during disaster relief operations. Normally led by the Emergency Preparedness and Response Directorate and the Federal Emergency Management Agency and joined by 27 federal agencies, including the American Red Cross, First Army Soldiers and civilian employees are proud of their mission to assist American families during times of crisis. The size of the First Army (and military) response depends upon the magnitude of the event requiring military support.

First U.S Army also performs two missions that, while not core functions, are significant in their importance to the Army: management of the Civilian Aides to the Secretary of the Army program and support to the National Boy Scout Jamboree.

First Army serves as the higher headquarters for three reserve divisions (training support (TS)): the 85th Division (TS), headquartered in Arlington Heights, Illinois; the 78th Division (TS), headquartered in Edison, New Jersey; and the 87th Division (TS), headquartered in Birmingham, Alabama. The two important missions of training and readiness support and mobilization of RC Soldiers are accomplished through these three divisions.

First Army was formed in France on Aug. 10, 1918, with Gen. John J. Pershing commanding. As America's first numbered Army, First Army engaged in two major operations: the reduction of the St. Mihiel Salient, east of Verdun, and the Meuse-Argonne offensive, west of Verdun. After World War I and a short period of occupation in Europe, First Army was inactivated in 1919. It was reactivated at Fort Jay, N.Y., in 1933.

On D-Day, June 6, 1944, with Gen. Omar N. Bradley commanding, First Army troops landed on Omaha and Utah beaches in Normandy. First Army established an impressive record of "firsts" in World War II: First on the beaches of Normandy, first to break out of the Normandy beachhead, first to enter Paris, first to break through the Siegfried Line, first to cross the Rhine River and first to meet the Russians. After World War II, First Army headquarters was located on Governors Island, New York. On January 1, 1966, First and Second Armies merged and First Army headquarters moved to Fort Meade, Maryland. In 1973, First Army transitioned from an active Army-oriented organization to one dedicated to improving the readiness of reserve components. In 1983, another reorganization took place. Second Army was reactivated at Fort Gillem and assumed responsibility for reserve component matters in seven states and two territories formerly assigned to First Army. In 1991, Fourth U.S. Army was inactivated and its seven Midwestern states became part of First Army. In 1995, First and Second Armies were once again consolidated and First Army moved to Fort Gillem.

52nd Ordnance Group (EOD) 
The wartime mission of the 52nd Ordnance Group (EOD) is to conduct force protection operations to defeat or lessen effects of conventional, unconventional (nuclear, biological, chemical or improvised explosive device) and terrorist munitions within its area of operations. Further, the group deploys, redeploys and assumes command and control of up to six ordnance battalions in a theater of operations, supporting the theater commander.

At Fort Gillem, the group headquarters commands and controls four battalion headquarters and 39 companies geographically separated throughout the United States. The group also runs the U.S. Army Very Important Persons Protective Service Agency, responsible for joint service coordination and tasking of EOD support to the U.S. Secret Service and the U.S. State Department.

Military Entrance Processing Station 
The Atlanta Military Entrance Processing Station (MEPS) is one of a network of 65 MEPS located nationwide and in Puerto Rico. The United States Military Entrance Processing Command (USMEPCOM) is a joint DoD agency staffed with personnel from all military services that reports directly to the Deputy Assistant Secretary of Defense for Military Personnel Policy. Although it is a separate DoD agency, USMEPCOM comprises two geographical sectors and staffed with personnel from all military services. The mission of USMEPCOM and the Atlanta MEPS is to process individuals for enlistment or induction into the armed services based on DoD-approved peacetime and mobilization standards. The Atlanta MEPS performs state-of-the-art testing, medical evaluation and processing for individuals wishing to enter military service. The three primary areas to be considered in determining an applicant's qualifications for enlistment are aptitude for military service, physical qualifications and background evaluation screening.

For reasons ranging from adventurism to educational benefits, almost 7,000 young men and women from the Atlanta area were qualified for entry into the five military services through the Atlanta MEPS in fiscal year 2007. In most cases, the term of enlistment in the military service includes specialized job training. When these young men and women complete their service obligation, they return to their local community with valuable skills, disciplined work ethics and on-the-job experience.

The current location for the Atlanta MEPS was designed and built specifically for use by the MEPS. With an approximate construction cost of $3.7 million, groundbreaking for the new facility was held August 14, 1997. Personnel from the MEPS began processing applicants from this facility August 30, 1999. The normal tour of duty for military personnel assigned to the station is three years. All personnel assigned to the MEPS have the primary mission of assisting each branch of the military in processing personnel for duty in the U.S. Armed Forces.

The Atlanta MEPS has enlistment responsibility for 95 counties in Georgia, including 316 high schools and five strategically located Military Examination Test (MET) sites. Aside from the MEPS located at Fort Gillem, the five MET sites in the state of Georgia area offer aptitude testing to applicants near their homes, which eliminates unnecessary applicant travel. Those sites are located in Athens, Columbus, Dobbins Air Reserve Base, Macon and Robins Air Force Base.

As with any business, the Atlanta MEPS has considerable operating overhead which directly benefits the local business community. The Atlanta MEPS' paid contracts and services during the fiscal year 2007 were more than $4 million.

Headquarters, 3d Military Police Group (CID) 
The 3d Military Police Group (Criminal Investigation Division)(3d MP Group (CID)) is a tactical headquarters located at Fort Gillem. The mission of the 3d MP Group (CID) and its four organic battalions is to provide a full range of criminal investigative support and services for commanders, installations and other areas of Army interest in the 28 states east of the Mississippi, the District of Columbia, Puerto Rico, Central and South America and the Caribbean. It also is responsible for providing criminal investigative support to all Army interests within the United States Central Command (USCENTCOM) area of responsibility (AOR).

USCENTCOM's AOR comprises the 25 countries in Southwest Asia (Northern Red Sea Region, South and Central Asia, Arabian Peninsula, Iraq and the Horn of Africa). Investigative support to this operational theater includes: criminal investigations of felony crimes, logistical security, criminal intelligence assessments, personal security protection for DoD officials and visiting foreign dignitaries, force protection and safeguarding of critical resources in peacetime, combat and contingency operations. The group also works with other federal, state and local law enforcement agencies and uses the latest equipment, systems and investigative techniques.

The 3d MP Group (CID) is organized into a command group and seven staff divisions, including personnel and administration, operations, logistics, resource management, staff judge advocate, information management and Headquarters and Headquarters Detachment.

The group exercises command and control of 35 subordinate units. These units support key Army field elements, including: XVIII Airborne Division, Fort Bragg, N.C.; the 101st Air Assault Division|101st Air Assault Division (Light), Fort Campbell, Ky.; the Third Infantry Division, Fort Stewart; the 10th Mountain Division (Light), Fort Drum, N.Y.; and Third Army (ARCENT). The 3d MP Group (CID) is also responsible for providing support for various major commands in their area, including: DA, U.S. Army Forces Command, U.S. Army Training and Doctrine Command, U.S. Central Command, U.S. Southern Command, U.S. Joint Forces Command and U.S. Special Operations Command.

U.S. Army Criminal Investigation Laboratory 
The US Army Criminal Investigation Command (USACIL) provides forensic laboratory services to DoD investigative agencies and other federal law enforcement agencies.

USACIL also operates an army school to train forensic laboratory examiners and manages the U.S. Criminal Investigation Command criminalistics program.

USACIL is the DoD forensic laboratory with the most extensive range of capabilities to support all defense criminal investigation organizations worldwide. The laboratory is equipped for analysis in multiple forensic disciplines. USACIL performs forensic analysis in support of criminal investigations in the laboratory, at crime scenes or deployed into combat theaters. USACIL examiners routinely present expert testimony in criminal trials around the globe.

From 2007–2011, the lab underwent scrutiny for a series of instances of personnel misconduct and allegations of poor investigative work.

Southeastern Army Reserve Intelligence Support Center 
The Southeastern Army Reserve Intelligence Support Center (Language Lab) at Fort Gillem provides battle-focused intelligence training support to improve reserve component technical intelligence skills, proficiency and readiness.

The center augments the total force's intelligence and linguistic capabilities and supports multi-service reserve component intelligence personnel and units in satisfying requirements of warfighters and national intelligence agencies.

United States Army 2nd Recruiting Brigade 
The U.S. Army 2nd Recruiting Brigade, headquartered at Fort Gillem, directs the efforts of nine recruiting battalions located throughout the southeastern United States. The battalions under the U.S. Army 2nd Recruiting Brigade are located in Smyrna, Ga.; Columbia, S.C.; Jackson, Miss.; Jacksonville, Fla.; Miami, Fla.; Tampa, Fla.; Montgomery, Ala.; Nashville, Tenn.; and Raleigh, N.C.

Headquarters functions include command management, administration, operations, liaison, program budget and accounting logistics, advertising and public affairs for operation of the brigade headquarters and its recruiting battalions.

Atlanta Distribution Center – Army and Air Force Exchange Service 
The Army and Air Force Exchange Service Atlanta Distribution Center (ADC) mission is twofold: to receive, store and distribute retail, cost, food and expense merchandise to primary customers in the Southeastern United States and to receive, store and distribute specialized merchandise—music, video, jewelry, military clothing, catalog, books and magazines—to customers worldwide.

The ADC completed construction of a  facility next to four existing  buildings at Fort
Gillem in the spring of 1999, making it one of the most modern facilities of its kind.

U.S. Army Center for Health Promotion and Preventive Medicine 
The U.S. Army Center for Health Promotion and Preventive Medicine (USACHPPM) mission is to provide worldwide health promotion and preventive medicine leadership and services to identify, assess and counter environmental, occupational and disease threats to the health, fitness and readiness of America's Army, the Army community and the Army civilian workforce. The unit's lineage can be traced back over 50 years to the Army Industrial Hygiene Laboratory, established at the beginning of World War II and, under the direct jurisdiction of The Army Surgeon General, conducted occupational health surveys of Army-operated industrial plants, arsenals and depots. These surveys were aimed at identifying and eliminating occupational health hazards within the DoD's industrial production base and proved to be of great benefit to the nation's war effort.

The more than 1,000-person USACHPPM team is a linchpin of medical support to combat forces and of the military managed-care system. It provides worldwide scientific expertise and services in clinical and field preventive medicine, environmental and occupational health, health promotion and wellness, epidemiology and disease surveillance, toxicology and related laboratory sciences. Professional disciplines represented include chemists, physicists, engineers, physicians, optometrists, epidemiologists, audiologists, nurses, industrial hygienists, toxicologists and entomologists, as well as sub-specialties within these professions.

The USACHPPM headquarters is located at the South Area of Aberdeen Proving Ground, Md. Five regional subordinate commands are located at Fort George G. Meade, Md.; Fort Lewis, Wash.; Landstuhl, Germany; Camp Zama, Japan; and Fort McPherson, Ga.

Located in Building 180 on Fort McPherson, USACHPPM-South is responsible for providing preventive medicine services and training to the southeast region of the continental U.S. The unit consists of five divisions: entomological sciences, field preventive medicine, industrial hygiene, quality management support and environmental health engineering. USACHPPM-South can request additional support in other, more specialized areas from its headquarters to support its regional customers.

USACHPPM-South is in the process of relocating to Fort Sam Houston, Texas, and expects to complete this move by September 30, 2009. At Fort Sam Houston, USACHPPM-South will continue to provide "cutting edge" public health services to all DoD entities (both active and reserve components) in the southeast region of the continental United States.

History of Fort McPherson

Origins 

It was during that year that a post was established in west Atlanta on the grounds where Spelman College is now located. Between the years 1867 and 1881, the post was garrisoned in turn by elements of the 2nd, 16th and 18th U.S. Infantry Regiments and the 5th Artillery. Their mission was to enforce Union regulations during the reconstruction period following the Civil War.

In October 1881, Secretary of War Robert T. Lincoln directed that the lease of the site be surrendered and the buildings sold at public auction. In compliance with this directive, McPherson Barracks was abandoned by U.S. troops Dec. 8, 1881. Part of the site was purchased by the American Baptist Missionary Society for use by the Atlanta Baptist Female Seminary, which later became Spelman College. The U.S. Treasury realized $17,264.40 from the sale of the buildings. March 3, 1885, Congress passed the Sundry Civil Bill, which contained an initial sum of $15,000 for the purchase of land and the erection of a 10-company post. The task of site selection went to Maj. Gen. Winfield Scott Hancock, commanding general of the Division of the Atlantic. Capt. Joshua W. Jacobs, assistant quartermaster, was responsible for developing and implementing the first master plan for the post.

That same year, Maj. Gen. John A. Schofield, chief of staff, suggested the new post be formally named in honor of Maj. Gen. James Birdseye McPherson. During the Civil War, McPherson participated in the Battles of Jackson and Vicksburg earning promotion to brigadier general. In 1864 he was in command of one of the Three Armies under the Major General William T. Sherman's Military Division of the Mississippi.  He was killed while on a reconnaissance patrol during the Battle of Atlanta July 22, 1864.  He is the highest-ranking officer to have been killed by position in the history of the United States, He commanded the Union Army of the Tennessee.  US Army Engineers built a monument to him on the site he was killed in 1888, in East Atlanta and maintained to this day by the Sons of Union Veterans of the American Civil War, SUVCW.

During the Spanish–American War, Fort McPherson served as a general hospital and as a recruit training center for nearly 20,000 men. Barracks were filled to overflowing and emergency tents were set up. It later became a prisoner of war (POW) facility, and by the end of July 1898, 16 Spanish Army prisoners were incarcerated in what is now the Post Chapel.

World War I 

During World War I, Fort McPherson was selected to be an internment camp for German POWs; a base hospital, General Hospital No. 6; and the site of an officers' training camp.

Immediately to the west of the post, across Campbellton Road, a war prison barracks was established to confine German POWs. The prison camp reached a peak population of 1,411 in July 1918.

The secretary of war directed that the permanent barracks of Fort McPherson be made available for general or base hospital use June 23, 1917. The command of the post was turned over to the ranking medical officer and Fort McPherson transformed itself into a general hospital with a capacity of nearly 2,400 beds. It is estimated that more than 10,000 patients were admitted from August 1917 until December 1918.

Fort McPherson served as the headquarters for the IV Corps Area from 1920 until 1923 and 1927 until 1934. In the 1930s, the post hospital was greatly expanded to serve as a rehabilitation center and the post served as the headquarters for District B of the Civilian Conservation Corps.

World War II 
With the passage of the 1940 Selective Service Act and the outbreak of World War II, Fort McPherson activities were greatly expanded. In addition to serving as a general depot, a reception center was established to process thousands of men for entry into the service and the post again served as a major hospital center.

In August 1945, as World War II ended, the United States War Department reversed the flow of work at the induction center. Fort McPherson became a separation center for almost 200,000 Soldiers and processed countless others for reassignment.

Historic buildings 
The 40 buildings that comprise the historic district are listed on the National Register of Historic Places. Some of those buildings and their histories are:

Hodges Hall 
Hodges Hall, (Building 65) the post headquarters, was built in 1904 as a double barracks at a cost of $55,000. It has a distinctive horseshoe shape and is a departure from the  interval between the other barracks. This building is named in honor of Gen. Courtney Hodges, commander of Third United States Army and First United States Army during World War II. Today, this facility houses the offices of the garrison commander and staff.

Troop Row 
Construction of Troop Row began in 1889 at the east end with Building 56. All of the buildings are double barracks except Building 60, in the center, which is a triple barracks. The average cost of these buildings was $26,000. The Audie Murphy Barracks Complex opened in 1998, replacing the use of the barracks. The Troop Row barracks have been converted to office space.

Post Chapel 
The chapel(Building 42) was built between 1886 and 1889 as the post guardhouse. During the Spanish–American War, this building served as a place of confinement for 16 POWs. In 1921, pews, 11 stained-glass windows and four stained-glass transoms were
added to the structure when it was converted into a chapel.

Hospital 
The original post hospital, General Hospital No. 6 (Buildings 170 and 171 ), was built between 1886 and 1889 at a cost of $11,414. During World War I, the hospital was so important that the senior ranking medical officer commanded the post. Between August 1917 and December 1918, more than 10,000 Soldiers were admitted. During both world wars, many of the surrounding buildings, including Troop Row, were used as hospital wards. In 1977, the hospital became a clinic and the majority of the building was converted to administrative space. In January 1998, the Lawrence Joel United States Army Health and Dental Clinic was dedicated and opened in Building 125. Building 170 and 171 house Installation Management Command, Southeast Region, headquarters.

Public safety 
Construction was completed on Buildings 100,101 and 102 in 1898, 1893 and 1889, respectively. The first two were storehouses for the commissary and the quartermaster, while Building 102 was the post bakery. The bakery contained three rooms and two ovens to bake bread. At one time, tokens were used, evidently as a means of ration control. These small tokens were redeemable for one loaf of bread. Today, these buildings are used by the Office of Public Safety, which houses the Chief, Directorate of Emergency Services and his staff.

Chapel Center 
Construction was completed on this facility (Building 51) in 1893 at a reported cost of $13,000. The main floor provided rooms for the officer and sergeant of the guard, the noncommissioned officers of the guard force and the members of the guard itself. Space was also provided for a prison room, with two cages for prisoners, six single cells for garrison prisoners and water closets for both the prisoners and the guards. This one-story brick building was the guardhouse and the post prison. In 1949, it was converted to the Central Telephone Exchange for the post. Today, it houses the post chaplain and staff.

Print Plant 
This building (Building 50) was built in 1918 as the post firehouse. It had a capacity of one truck and seven beds. The brickwork covering the old vehicle entrance in the front can still be seen under the small portico. In 1941, it was converted into the post office and used in that capacity until December 2002.

Recreation Center 
Built in 1918 by the Red Cross as a convalescent center for hospital patients, this building (Building 46) was built in the shape of a Maltese cross. In 1919, the building was taken over by the Army and converted into a service club. Today, it is used as office space, a meeting area and more.

Pershing Hall 
The original and present-day bachelor officers' quarters (Building 16) was completed in 1904. This facility was originally given the number 16 to incorporate the structure with the numbering system for the 19 sets of quarters on Staff Row, numbered 1 through 20, which is the reason why there is no number 16 on Staff Row. This building was named in honor of General of the Armies of the United States John "Blackjack" Pershing. During his career, Pershing served as the commander-in-chief of the American Expeditionary Forces in World War I and later as the Army chief of staff.

Van Horn Hall 
Completed in 1889 as the original post headquarters, this two-story structure (Building 41) contained office space for the commander, adjutant, sergeant major, clerks, library, mail and court martial room. In 1891, the first rental of a telephone line to Atlanta for $12.50 a month was authorized. In 1893, $17 was approved for material and labor to install electric bells and connections in the building to facilitate communication and the transaction of business in the headquarters. Thus, the first known "intercom" system was installed on post. This building was named in honor of Brig. Gen. Robert O. Van Horn, who served as post commander from January 1934 until August 1940. This six-and-a-half-year period is the longest post commander's tour in the installation's history. In 1957, the building became office space for the staff judge advocate.

Staff Row 

Staff Row consists of 19 officer quarters — four single-family residences and 15 duplexes. These quarters were built from 1891 until 1910 at an average cost of $15,000. The original concept for Staff Row was to build homes for the officers of an artillery regiment with 10 batteries. At full strength, such a unit would be authorized a colonel, a lieutenant colonel, three majors, 10 captains, 20 first lieutenants and 10 second lieutenants. The final home built on Staff Row in 1910 is currently the residence of the post commander. The small lot required that Quarters 18 also be a single-family unit.

Hedekin Field 
Staff Row faces the post parade ground, Hedekin Field. Originally a polo field, it is named in honor of Capt. David Drew Hedekin, an avid polo player who commanded Headquarters Company here from 1936 through 1938. Hedekin was fatally injured while playing in a polo tournament at Fort Oglethorpe, Georgia, July 17, 1938. He died there July 20, 1938. A monument to Capt. Hedekin is located on the edge of the parade field across from Quarters 10. Today, Hedekin Field is the site of colorful parades, retirement ceremonies and other special celebrations.

Quarters 10 

Quarters 10 is the centerpiece of Staff Row. Completed in 1892, the three-story home has -high ceilings on the first floor, -high ceilings on the second, and semicircular front windows in the turret. In 1925, Gen. Douglas MacArthur was assigned to Fort McPherson as post commander. Since his wife refused to live in the quarters, they rented an apartment downtown near the Fox Theatre. The MacArthurs left after having spent 89 days at Fort McPherson, when he was reassigned to Baltimore. A sleeping porch was added to the back of the quarters in 1935 for President Franklin D. Roosevelt's visits while he was en route to Warm Springs, Georgia.

Other structures 
For a short time, German POWs were held on Troop Row. In June 1917, they constructed the war prison barracks located just west of the post between Campbellton Road and Venetian Drive. By June 1919, 1,346 prisoners were interned at Fort McPherson. Many homes located west of the post were later built on the cement slab foundations left behind after the prison barracks were torn down in late 1919. The oldest structure still in use at Fort McPherson is located on Miller Drive.

Quarters 532 was built in 1887 at a cost of $2,470. The single-family dwelling has  of space. It was originally the residence of the civilian post engineer, a plumber, who was in charge of operating the water pump station. Chief Warrant Officer Ulie H. Jeffers, chief field clerk, lived in these quarters from 1923 through 1950. This period of 27 years probably established a record for the continuous occupancy of a set of Army quarters by one individual. The home was later inhabited by the commander, Intelligence Support Element Ft. McPherson (513th MI Bde), Army Captain Steven S. Walsky and family; and appropriately, finally by Chief Warrant Officer Clyde Green, the last Vietnam War draftee to remain on active duty (retired in 2010).

Headwaters of Utoy Creek 
Natural springs are one of the headwaters for South Utoy Creek traveling northwest to the Chattahoochee River.

See also 
 List of United States Army installations
 List of United States military bases

References

External links 

 
 
 Atlanta, Georgia, a National Park Service Discover Our Shared Heritage Travel Itinerary
 Fort McPherson historical marker

McPherson
Buildings and structures in Fulton County, Georgia
McPherson
Civilian Conservation Corps in Georgia (U.S. state)
Atlanta metropolitan area
Military headquarters in the United States
Prisoner of war camps in the United States
1885 establishments in Georgia (U.S. state)
2011 disestablishments in Georgia (U.S. state)
Military installations established in 1885
Military installations closed in 2011
World War I prisoner-of-war camps